Mah farvardin Ruz khordad is a book written in Middle Persian in the 7th century CE.  It was written ca. 607-608 CE, during the reign of Khosrau II.

This book described all the events which historically or mythically occurred on the 6th day of the Persian month of Farvardin.

Sources
Mīrzā-yi Nāẓir, Ibrāhīm. 1994. Rūz-i Hurmuzd māh-i farwardīn ; Māh-i farwardīn, rūz-i k̲urdād : (hamrāh ba matn-i Pārsī-yi Miyāna, āwāniwīsī, wāžanāma wa yāddāšthā). Mašhad: Intišārāt-i Tarāna.

See also
 Middle Persian literature
 Middle Persian
 Persian mythology
 The Silk Roads

Middle Persian literature
History books about Iran
7th century in Iran
7th-century history books